Woodlawn Cemetery is the name of a cemetery in Elmira, New York, United States. Its most famous burials are Mark Twain and his wife Olivia Langdon Clemens. Many members of the United States Congress, including Jacob Sloat Fassett are also interred there.

Within Woodlawn Cemetery is the distinct Woodlawn National Cemetery, begun with the interment of Confederate prisoners from the nearby Elmira Prison (dubbed "Hellmira" by its inmates) during the American Civil War.  It is run by the United States Department of Veterans Affairs.

Both cemeteries are still active and together were added to the National Register of Historic Places in 2004.

Notable burials
 John Arnot, Jr. (1831–1886) US Representative, mayor, Civil War in veteran, businessman
 James Chaplin Beecher (1828–1886), Civil War general
 Frank LaMar Christian (1876–1955), prison warden
 Clara Clemens (1874–1962), concert singer and Mark Twain's only surviving child and widow of Ossip Gabrilowitsch
 Jean Clemens (1880–1909), Mark Twain's youngest daughter
 Olivia Langdon Clemens (1845–1904), Mark Twain's wife and editor
 Samuel Langhorne Clemens (Mark Twain) (1835–1910), author
 Susy Clemens (1872–1896), Mark Twain's eldest daughter and a biographer of him
 Ernie Davis (1939–1963), Heisman Trophy winner from Syracuse University
 Alexander S. Diven (1809–1896), Civil War general
 Jacob Sloat Fassett (1853–1924), US Representative
 Thomas S. Flood (1844–1908), US Representative
 Ossip Gabrilowitsch (1878–1936), Russian-born American pianist married to Clara Clemens.
 Hiram Gray (1801–1890), US Representative
 John W. Jones (1817–1900), ex-slave and sexton of Woodlawn National Cemetery
 Thomas Maxwell (1792–1864), US Representative
 Anna Campbell Palmer (1854–1928), novelist
 Samuel Partridge (1790–1883), US Representative
 Alexander W. Randall (1819–1872), 6th Governor of Wisconsin
 Hal Roach (1892–1992), comedy film & television producer
 Lucius Robinson (1810–1891),  Governor of New York
 Hosea H. Rockwell (1840–1918), US Representative
 Horace B. Smith (1826–1888), US Representative
 Esther Baker Steele (1835–1911), educator, author, editor, philanthropist
 Asher Tyler (1798–1875), US Representative
 Jonas S. Van Duzer (1846–1918), creamery manufacturer and assemblyman

Gallery

References

External links

 
 From VintageViews.org:
 Mark Twain's Grave
 Entrance to the Cemetery (1910s)
 

Buildings and structures in Elmira, New York
Cemeteries on the National Register of Historic Places in New York (state)
Tourist attractions in Chemung County, New York
Cemeteries in Chemung County, New York
National Register of Historic Places in Chemung County, New York
1864 establishments in New York (state)